Eloni Vunakece (born 27 May 1987) is a former Fiji international rugby league footballer who played as a  for the Sydney Roosters in the NRL. He also played for Toulouse Olympique in the French Elite One Championship.

Background
Vunakece was born in Sydney, New South Wales, Australia to a Fijian father, Meli, from Tavua and an Australian mother Julie Young from St Arnaud, Victoria. He played his junior rugby league for the Holy Cross Rhinos and Leichhardt Wanderers, before being signed by the Balmain Ryde-Eastwood Tigers.

Vunakece is married with four children.

Playing career

Early career
From 2006 to 2011, Vunakece played for the Balmain Ryde-Eastwood Tigers, while also having a stint with the Western Suburbs Magpies New South Wales Cup side in 2011. In September 2011, he signed a 1-year contract with French team Toulouse Olympique in the Elite One Championship. In 2012, he re-signed with Toulouse on a 1-year contract.

2013
In April, Vunakece played in two games for Toulouse in the 2013 Challenge Cup, scoring 2 tries. At the conclusion of the 2012/2013 Elite One Championship season, he returned to Australia to play with the Wyong Roos in the New South Wales Cup. In October and November, he played 5 games for Fiji in the 2013 Rugby League World Cup, scoring 1 try.

2015
On 2 May, Vunakece played for Fiji against Papua New Guinea in the 2015 Melanesian Cup. At the end of the 2015 season, he got the chance to join the Sydney Roosters first-grade squad for the 2016 pre-season.

2016
In round 4 of the 2016 NRL season, Vunakece made his NRL debut for the Sydney Roosters against the Manly-Warringah Sea Eagles. On 7 May, he again played for Fiji against Papua New Guinea in the 2016 Melanesian Cup, where he played at lock and scored a try. In September, he was named at prop in the 2016 Intrust Super Premiership NSW Team of the Year.

2017
On 28 August 2017, Vunakece was named at Prop in the 2017 Intrust Super Premiership NSW team of the year.

Post rugby league and Reality TV
In September 2018, Vunakece announced his retirement from rugby league. He has been working for the council as a garbage collector and also doing some modelling. He also donated his brain, currently as a living participant in post-concussion cognitive research. Vunakece competed in the Australian Ninja Warrior (season 3). He returned in seasons 4 and 5.

Vunakece will appear as a contestant on the sixth season of The Celebrity Apprentice Australia.

References

External links
Sydney Roosters profile
Roosters profile

Toulouse Olympique profile
2017 RLWC profile

1987 births
Living people
Australian rugby league players
Australian people of I-Taukei Fijian descent
Balmain Ryde-Eastwood Tigers players
Expatriate rugby league players in France
Fiji national rugby league team players
I-Taukei Fijian people
Rugby league props
Rugby league players from Sydney
Sydney Roosters players
Toulouse Olympique players
Western Suburbs Magpies NSW Cup players
Wyong Roos players